The Fleet That Came to Stay was a propaganda short film produced by the US Navy in 1945 about the naval engagements of the invasion of Okinawa.

The film opens with the small talk of the American GIs soon after they find out where they are headed. One notes that he hears the island looks like San Francisco, while another responds that he once drove from LA to Frisco in eight hours, prompting another to boast that he once covered the 360 miles from Buffalo to New York in six. Then it dawns on the servicemen that they will be less than 350 miles from Japan when they get to Okinawa.

The narration begins at that point explaining that the fleet on its way to Okinawa will be the first in history to come into battle with a land-based aerial opponent. Up to this point the Japanese have been at an aerial disadvantage, needing to fly a great distance from Japan to engage the enemy, or be stationed on an aircraft carrier that could be sunk. But now the Americans were coming up right under their home base. The narrator also talks at length about the kamikaze pilots and the difficulties the Navy has had with them in recent months.

Much of the film is taken up with the kamikaze attacks, and the American pilots trying to shoot them down over the Pacific so they won't crash into Allied warships, which many of them do. There is much footage of the Americans trying to repair the ships while the battle is still going on. Twice during the film the GIs take time to reflect on news coming from abroad: on April 13, they learn of Franklin D. Roosevelt's death, and on May 9, VE-Day.

See also
List of Allied propaganda films of World War II

External links
 The Fleet That Came to Stay (1945)
 
 

1945 films
American World War II propaganda shorts
American aviation films
Films about the United States Navy in World War II
American black-and-white films
American documentary films
1945 documentary films
1940s American films